Alexander Hamilton Holley (August 12, 1804 – October 2, 1887) was an American politician and the 40th governor of Connecticut.

Life and politics
Holley was born in Salisbury, Connecticut, on August 12, 1804. He was a Congregationalist and studied at the public schools in Massachusetts, Connecticut, and New York.  He was married to Jane M. Lyman (1808–1832), Marcia Coffing and Sarah C. Day. He had six children.

Career
Holley served in the state militia, rising through the ranks to lieutenant colonel. He entered politics in 1844, serving as a delegate to the Whig National Convention. Holley became president of the Holley Manufacturing Company in 1854 and held that position for life. He also became director of the Salisbury Iron Bank and Connecticut Western Railroad.

Holley was nominated by the Republican Party and elected the 45th lieutenant governor of Connecticut in 1854, and elected the governor of Connecticut in 1857. During his term, his administration endorsed the requirement for recently naturalized citizens to wait one year before being eligible to vote, and the Supreme Court ruled on the Dred Scott case.  He left office on May 5, 1858. He was a delegate to Republican National Convention from Connecticut, 1860,  and retired from public service.

Death
Holley died on October 2, 1887, in Lakeville. He is buried at Salisbury Cemetery, Salisbury, Connecticut.

References

Further reading
 Sobel, Robert and John Raimo. Biographical Directory of the Governors of the United States, 1789-1978. Greenwood Press, 1988.

External links
National Governors Association

The Political Graveyard

1804 births
1887 deaths
Republican Party governors of Connecticut
People from Salisbury, Connecticut
Military personnel from Connecticut
19th-century American politicians